Wilhelm Mayer may refer to:

  (1886–1950), German General in the Luftwaffe
  (1874–1923), German politician (Center, BVP)
 Wilhelm Mayer (composer) (1831–1898)
 Wilhelm Mayer (fighter pilot) (1917–1945), German World War II Luftwaffe ace